Irina Tananayko (born 5 March 1976) is a Belarusian biathlete. She competed in the three events at the 1998 Winter Olympics.

References

1976 births
Living people
Biathletes at the 1998 Winter Olympics
Belarusian female biathletes
Olympic biathletes of Belarus
Place of birth missing (living people)